This is a list of all the United States Supreme Court cases from volume 522 of the United States Reports:

External links

1997 in United States case law
1998 in United States case law